The Uganda five-toed skink (Leptosiaphos aloysiisabaudiae) is a species of lizard in the family Scincidae. The species is endemic to Sub-Saharan Africa.

Etymology
The specific name, aloysiisabaudiae, is in honor of Italian explorer Prince Luigi Amedeo, Duke of the Abruzzi.

Geographic range
L. aloysiisabaudiae is found in Nigeria, Cameroon, Democratic Republic of the Congo, South Sudan, and Uganda. It might occur in the Central African Republic.

Habitat
The habitats of L. aloysiisabaudiae are riverine woodlands, swampland, moist savannas, and pine plantations.

Description
L. aloysiisabaudiae is a small lizard with a long tail. It is brown dorsally, and it is whitish ventrally. The upper labials are also whitish.

Reproduction
L. aloysiisabaudiae is oviparous.

References

Further reading
Greer AE (1974). "The genetic relationships of the Scincid lizard genus Leiolopisma and its relatives". Australian Journal of Zoology Supplemental Series 22 (31): 1–67. (Panaspis aloysii-sabaudiae, new combination, p. 29).
Peracca MG (1907). "Spedizione al Ruwenzori di S[ua]. A[ltezza]. R[eale]. Luigi Amedeo di Savoia Duca degli Abruzzi. XV. Nuovi Rettili ed Amfibii (Diagnosi preventive)". Bollettino dei Musei di Zoologia ed Anatomia comparata della R[egia]. Università di Torino 22 (553): 1–3. ("Lygosoma (Siaphos) Aloysii-Sabaudiae", new species, pp. 1–3). (in Italian).
Spawls S, Howell K, Hinkel H, Menegon M (2018). Field Guide to East African Reptiles, Second Edition. London: Bloomsbury Natural History. 624 pp. . (Leptosiaphos aloysiisabaudiae, p. 158).

Leptosiaphos
Skinks of Africa
Reptiles of Cameroon
Reptiles of the Democratic Republic of the Congo
Reptiles of Nigeria
Reptiles of South Sudan
Reptiles of Uganda
Reptiles described in 1907
Taxa named by Mario Giacinto Peracca